The  Sri Lankan High Commissioner to the United Kingdom is the Sri Lankan envoy to United Kingdom. Countries belonging to the Commonwealth of Nations typically exchange High Commissioners, rather than Ambassadors. Though there are a few technical differences (for instance, whereas Ambassadors present their diplomatic credentials to the host country's head of state, High Commissioners are accredited to the head of government), they are in practice one and the same office. The Sri Lankan High Commissioner to the United Kingdom is concurrently accredited as the Ambassador to the Republic of Ireland. The current post of High Commissioner is occupied by Manisha Gunasekara.

List of High Commissioners

Representatives of the Government of Ceylon

High Commissioners

Deputy High Commissioners
 Sir Velupillai Coomaraswamy, CMG (1948-1953)
 Theodore Duncan Perera, CMG (1953-1956)
 B. F. Perera, CMG, OBE (1956-1958)

See also

High Commission of Sri Lanka, London
List of heads of missions from Sri Lanka

References

External links

 The High Commission of Sri Lanka in the UK

Lists of ambassadors to the United Kingdom
 
United Kingdom
Sri Lanka and the Commonwealth of Nations
United Kingdom and the Commonwealth of Nations